Saeed Hassan Salem Al-Kass is a Emirati footballer who last played as a striker for Ajman Club.

Saeed started his career in Dibba Al-Hisn Sports Club in the UAE Second Division League. Since his beginning he was successful in attracting the eyes of the First Division Clubs Scouts. He was signed by Sharjah FC in 1998 which helped him secure a place in the UAE national squad. He is known for scoring two goals against Japan and Qatar during the 2007 AFC Asian Cup.

He was transferred to Al Wasl FC from Sharjah FC during the Winter 2008 transfer window.

The 2009-10 season was particularly special. During the 2009-10 Gulf Club Champions Cup, Saeed helped his team Al Wasl FC win the title. Saeed himself won the Top Scorer title with 6 goals. 
He returned to Sharjah FC after three successful seasons with Al Wasl. In 2012, he moved to Ajman.

Personal life
Saeed has a son named Mayed and he has a Bachelor of Science degree in electronic

Notes

Living people
Al-Wasl F.C. players
Sharjah FC players
Emirati footballers
1976 births
Dibba Al-Hisn Sports Club players
2007 AFC Asian Cup players
2011 AFC Asian Cup players
Ajman Club players
Footballers at the 2002 Asian Games
UAE First Division League players
UAE Pro League players
Association football forwards
Asian Games competitors for the United Arab Emirates
United Arab Emirates international footballers